Lloyd Barker (born 12 December 1970) is a former professional soccer player who played for the Jamaica national football team.

Playing career

After beginning his pro career in 1988 with the Ottawa Intrepid of the Canadian Soccer League. He then joined the Montreal Impact in 1993 and was part of the team's starting eleven when the Impact beat the Colorado Foxes 1–0 in the playoff final and won the 1994 league championship. He also helped Montreal win the regular-season titles in 1995, 1996, and 1997.

Barker played internationally for Jamaica, including in a 0–3 friendly loss to the United States in Kingston on 22 November 1994.

In 1995 Barker won the Giuseppe Saputo Trophy and was picked on the league's first all-star team in 1995. In 1999 Barker was transferred to Impact rivals the Toronto Lynx where he gave new impetus to his career when he moved from the forward position to that of defender.

He left the Lynx in 2001 to join the Impact again where he helped the team win their second League Championship in 2004 against the Seattle Sounders.

Barker also played in the National Professional Soccer League for the Edmonton Drillers, Montreal Impact and Detroit Rockers.

Managerial career
He retired as a player following the 2004 season, was third in Impact history for games played (190), as well as second for goals scored (34).

He was assistant coach with the Impact in 2005, helping the team win the regular-season title.

On 24 July 2007 he was appointed the head coach of the men's Concordia University soccer team.

References

1970 births
Living people
A-League (1995–2004) players
American Professional Soccer League players
Canadian soccer coaches
Canadian Soccer League (1987–1992) players
Expatriate soccer players in Canada
Jamaican expatriate footballers
Jamaican expatriate sportspeople in Canada
Jamaican expatriate sportspeople in the United States
Jamaican footballers
Jamaica international footballers
Ottawa Intrepid players
Montreal Impact (1992–2011) players
Sportspeople from Kingston, Jamaica
Toronto Lynx players
Harbour View F.C. players
Edmonton Drillers (1996–2000) players
Detroit Rockers players
National Professional Soccer League (1984–2001) players
Major League Soccer broadcasters
Association football forwards